Parapionycha lizeri is a species of beetle in the family Carabidae, the only species in the genus Parapionycha.

References

Ctenodactylinae